Aynuru Toychiyevna Altybayeva (born 28 February 1958) is a Kyrgyz politician, and current member of the Supreme Council of Kyrgyzstan.

Early life and education
Altybayeva was born on 28 February 1958 in the city of Osh in Osh Oblast in the Kirgiz SSR, now Kyrgyzstan. In 1979 she graduated from Kyrgyz State University with a degree in economics. She returned to the same university and received a degree in jurisprudence in 1998.

Career

Civil service roles, regional and national, 1979–2010
After graduation, Altybayeva worked in various roles in the Osh Oblast regional government for eighteen years, leaving in 1997. She moved to the country's tax collection department, working in its subdivisions for nine years, leaving in 2006. In 2007, Altybayeva worked for a year as the advisor to head of the Social Fund of the Kyrgyz Republic, and also as the deputy head of the fund's chapter at the Sverdlovsk district administration. Between 2008 and 2010 she was a consultant in the Supreme Council, and for a brief period before becoming deputy she was chairman of the public association Ayaldar Keneshi and chairman of the Birimdik political party.

Jogorku Kenesh deputy, 2010–present
Altybayeva was elected as deputy for the Ar-Namys party in the 2010 parliamentary election, and then switched allegiance to the Social Democratic Party of Kyrgyzstan in the 2015 parliamentary election.

Personal life
Altybayeva is married, and has two children.

See also
List of members of the Supreme Council (Kyrgyzstan), 2015–present

References

Living people
1958 births
People from Osh
Members of the Supreme Council (Kyrgyzstan)
Ar-Namys politicians
Social Democratic Party of Kyrgyzstan politicians
21st-century Kyrgyzstani women politicians
21st-century Kyrgyzstani politicians
Kyrgyz National University alumni